Kailash Chandra Meghwal (born 22 March 1934) is a former Speaker of Rajasthan Legislative Assembly, former union minister of state in Government of India and a national vice president of Bharatiya Janata Party. He represents MLA of Shahpura, Bhilwara constituency of Rajasthan in 14th Rajasthan Legislative Assembly & Ex-MP Tonk constituency of Rajasthan in 14th Lok Sabha. He was minister of state for social justice and empowerment from 2003 to 2004.

Born in 1983 in Udaipur District he did MA and LLB from University of Rajasthan. He was imprisoned in emergency in 1975 and released in 1977. He was president of Udaipur Bar Association  and a member of senate of Udaipur University.

Membership 
1977-1985 Member, Rajasthan Legislative Assembly (two terms)
1989 Elected to 9th Lok Sabha from Jalore
1990 Member, Rajasthan Legislative Assembly (3rd term)
1993-1998 Member, Rajasthan Legislative Assembly (4th term)
22 Sept. 2001 Re-elected to 13th Lok Sabha (in by-election, 2nd term)
2004 Re-elected to 14th Lok Sabha, (3rd term)
2013 Member, Rajasthan  Legislative Assembly (5th term)
2018 Member, Rajasthan Legislative Assembly (6th term)

Positions held 

1962 Joint Secretary, Praja Socialist Party. Rajasthan
1969-1975 Joint Secretary, Bharatiya Jansangh, Rajasthan
1977 Minister of State with Independent Charge of Ministry of Mines & Geology, Panchayati Raj & Sheep and Wool, Government of Rajasthan
1978 Cabinet Minister, Sahakarita and Mines and Geology, Government of Rajasthan
1980-1982 Secretary, Bharatiya Janata Party, Rajasthan
1981-1984 Member, Public Accounts Committee, Rajasthan Legislative Assembly
1982-1985 General Secretary, B.J.P., Rajasthan
1987 onwards Vice-President, B.J.P., Rajasthan
1991-1992 Cabinet Minister, Irrigation and Relief, Government of Rajasthan
1994-1998 Cabinet Minister, Ministry of Home, Mines and Printing, Government of Rajasthan
2003-2004 Union Minister of State, Social Justice and Empowerment
Cabinet Minister of Mines and Geology, Government of Rajasthan (20.12.2013-21.01.2014)
Speaker of Rajasthan Legislative Assembly (22.01.2014 to 15.01.2019)

References

External links
 Former Speaker

Rajasthani people
Bharatiya Jana Sangh politicians
Bharatiya Janata Party politicians from Rajasthan
Praja Socialist Party politicians
Rajasthan MLAs 1977–1980
Living people
1934 births
University of Rajasthan alumni
Home Ministers of Rajasthan
India MPs 2004–2009
People from Udaipur
India MPs 1989–1991
Lok Sabha members from Rajasthan
Speakers of the Rajasthan Legislative Assembly
Rajasthan MLAs 1980–1985
Rajasthan MLAs 1990–1992
Rajasthan MLAs 1993–1998
Rajasthan MLAs 1998–2003
Rajasthan MLAs 2003–2008
Rajasthan MLAs 2013–2018
Rajasthan MLAs 2018–2023
20th-century Indian lawyers
Indians imprisoned during the Emergency (India)
Politicians from Udaipur
India MPs 1999–2004
People from Jalore district
People from Tonk district